Charles C. Smith (October 8, 1908 – December 22, 1970) was a Speaker of the Pennsylvania House of Representatives.

Smith was elected to the Pennsylvania House of Representatives in 1944 and served through 1956. 

Smith was sworn-In on October 4, 1943 to serve the remainder of the 1943 term, and reelected to the House to 6 consecutive terms thereafter. 

He was from Philadelphia, Pennsylvania.

Biography 
Charles is a representative from Philadelphia County, and was born, October 8, in 1908. He graduated from Northeast High School in 1927, and after college he became a partner in a fuel business firm Smith and Boyd.

References

Members of the Pennsylvania House of Representatives
Pennsylvania Auditors General
Speakers of the Pennsylvania House of Representatives
1908 births
1970 deaths
20th-century American politicians